Hidden Valley was a ski resort in Vernon Township, New Jersey, United States, located off of County Route 515, near the intersection with Route 94, approximately an hour's drive from the George Washington Bridge. Since January 2016, the area has been repurposed as the National Winter Activity Center, which provides education and ski/snowboard instruction to groups that might not have access to winter sports.

History
Built by Jack and Peg Kurlander - the resort opened in 1975. In 2007 the resort, after years of struggling to compete with the nearby and much larger Mountain Creek, declared bankruptcy and was sold at a sheriff's auction. A group of investors bought it at auction with the intention of turning it into an all-inclusive resort. After an unusually warm winter in 2011 and numerous problems throughout,  it was once again put up for liquidation auction in the fall of 2013. It failed to sell at auction, and did not open for the 2013/2014 ski season.

In February 2014, the National Winter Activity Center (NWAC) began operating at the former Hidden Valley site.

The mountain
The resort had 15 trails - 25% beginner, 30% intermediate, and 45% advanced. The longest trail was Browse Along at three quarters of a mile (1.2 km). the mountain features a total of three lifts: two chairlifts  (2 Quads) and a surface lift.

Notable skiers
Champion freestyle skier Donna Weinbrecht, an Olympic gold medalist in moguls, learned to ski and trained at Hidden Valley.
 
Alpine skiers David Schneider Jr., Drew Schneider and Todd Schneider were brothers who trained at Hidden Valley. David made the US training squad at 17, Drew was invited to the U.S. Ski Team at age 14 and Todd later raced on the U.S. Ski Team in the late 1980s to early 90s. David Schneider, their father, was the head of and created the alpine training program in the 1970s at Great Gorge and Vernon Valley ski areas before the opening of Hidden Valley. He was also the first coach that Donna Weinbrecht had before she turned to freestyle, per Dave Schneider's recommendation.

Nolan Kasper, a slalom racer with the U.S. Ski Team, began skiing at Hidden Valley in the early 1990s at age three; his father was a ski instructor at the area.

References

Buildings and structures in Sussex County, New Jersey
Ski areas and resorts in New Jersey
Sports venues in New Jersey
Vernon Township, New Jersey
Tourist attractions in Sussex County, New Jersey
1976 establishments in New Jersey